Steromphala adansonii is a species of sea snail, a marine gastropod mollusk in the family Trochidae, the top snails.

Description
The height of the shell attains 12 mm, its diameter 10½ mm.

The narrowly umbilicate shell has a conical shape. Its color is maroon or deep brown, with longitudinal undulating flames of white, continuous or interrupted into spots on the base. The elevated spire is conoidal and contains 6 to 7convex whorls, traversed by numerous spiral striae. The large body whorl is dilated and subangulate at the periphery. The base of the shell is convex, concentrically finely lirate, each ridge divided by a central impressed line. The sutures are deeply impressed. The aperture is subquadrangular. The columella is straight or a little projecting in the middle. The deep umbilicus is very narrow, bounded by a carina.

Distribution
This species occurs in the Mediterranean Sea, the Adriatic Sea and the Black Sea.

References

 Monterosato T.A. di. (1923). Molluschi delle coste Cirenaiche raccolti dall'Ing. Crema. Memorie del Regio Comitato Talassografico Italiano. 106: 1-14.
 Nordsieck, F. (1972). Marine Gastropoden aus der Shiqmona-Bucht in Israël. Archiv für Molluskenkunde der Senckenbergischen Naturforschenden Gesellschaft. 102(4-6): 227-245.
 Gofas, S.; Le Renard, J.; Bouchet, P. (2001). Mollusca, in: Costello, M.J. et al. (Ed.) (2001). European register of marine species: a check-list of the marine species in Europe and a bibliography of guides to their identification. Collection Patrimoines Naturels, 50: pp. 180–213

External links
 
 Payraudeau B. C. (1826). Catalogue descriptif et méthodique des Annelides et des Mollusques de l'île de Corse. Paris, 218 pp. + 8 pl
 Récluz C. A. (1843). Catalogue descriptif de plusieurs nouvelles espèces de coquilles de France suivi d'observations sur quelques autres. Revue zoologique, par la Société Cuvierienne 6: 5-12, 104-112, 228-238, 257-261
 Brusina S. (1865). Conchiglie dalmate inedite. Verhandlungen der Kaiserlich-königlichen Zoologisch-botanisch Gesellschaft in Wien 15: 3-42,
 Monterosato T. A. (di). (1888-1889). Molluschi del Porto di Palermo. Specie e varietà. Bullettino della Società Malacologica Italiana. 13: 161-180 [15 October 1888; 14: 75-81]
 Payraudeau B. C. (1826). Catalogue descriptif et méthodique des Annelides et des Mollusques de l'île de Corse. Paris, 218 pp. + 8 pl
 Bucquoy E., Dautzenberg P. & Dollfus G. (1882-1886). Les mollusques marins du Roussillon. Tome Ier. Gastropodes. Paris: Baillière & fils. 570 pp., 66 pls
 Pallary P. (1912). Catalogue des mollusques du littoral méditerranéen de l'Egypte. Mémoires de l'Institut d'Egypte, 7(3): 69-207, pl. 15-18,
 Affenzeller S., Haar N. & Steiner G. (2017). Revision of the genus complex Gibbula: an integrative approach to delineating the Eastern Mediterranean genera Gibbula Risso, 1826, Steromphala Gray, 1847, and Phorcus Risso, 1826 using DNA-barcoding and geometric morphometrics (Vetigastropoda, Trochoidea). Organisms Diversity & Evolution. 17(4): 789-812

adansonii
Gastropods described in 1826